Nalla Neram, is a 1972 Indian Tamil-language action drama film, directed by M. A. Thirumugam. The film stars M. G. Ramachandran and K. R. Vijaya. It is a remake of the 1971 Hindi film Haathi Mere Saathi . All three versions were produced by Thevar. The film was released on 10 March 1972. It was MGR's last film with Devar Films. It was one of the biggest hits of 1972 after Vasantha Maligai.

Plot 
Raja "Raju" Kumar owns elephants and earns a livelihood by making them perform tricks. He falls in love with Vijaya and they get married. But soon, a problem arises. Vijaya hates elephants because of a personal tragedy in her life. She also feels that Raju spends too much time with his elephant friends. He had to choose between the love of his wife and the friendship of his loyal and devoted pet elephants.

Cast

Production 
Nalla Neram is a remake of the 1971 Hindi film Haathi Mera Saathi, which in turn was adapted from Chinnappa Thevar's own Tamil film Deiva Cheyal (1967) which flopped. This film was the last collaboration between Ramachandran and Thevar. For the song "Aagattumda Thambi", Ramachandran drove a '58 Chevrolet Impala.

Soundtrack 
The music was composed by K. V. Mahadevan.

References

External links 
 

1970s Tamil-language films
1972 films
Films about elephants
Films directed by M. A. Thirumugam
Films scored by K. V. Mahadevan
Films with screenplays by Salim–Javed
Tamil remakes of Hindi films